Urak Valley is a valley surrounded by mountains in the Quetta District of Balochistan Province, in western Pakistan. A small waterfall at its end marks entrance to the adjacent Wali Tangi Dam.

Urak Valley has a population of 10,000, and Almost all Kakar a sub tribe of Pashtuns. Pashtun is one of the largest tribes in Pakistan and Afghanistan. Agriculture in the valley includes growing apple trees of good quality and a few other fruits.

Gallery

See also 
Hana Lake
Hanna-Urak Waterfall
Wali Tangi Dam
Quetta

References 

Valleys of Balochistan (Pakistan)
Quetta District